Joseph Semanoff (August 16, 1916 – March 1981) was a Republican member of the Pennsylvania House of Representatives.

References

Republican Party members of the Pennsylvania House of Representatives
1916 births
1981 deaths
20th-century American politicians
People from Schuylkill County, Pennsylvania